The 2008 GP2 Asia Series season was the first GP2 Asia Series season. It started on 25 January and ended on 12 April.

Season summary 
Romain Grosjean became the champion despite his teammate Stephen Jelley scoring no points, with their team, ART Grand Prix, winning the teams' title.

In this season, only two drivers scored pole positions. Grosjean took pole in all but one race in Sentul, where Vitaly Petrov secured the first position on the grid. The Frenchman also won four races, including a clean sweep in Dubai and the feature race in Sakhir.

Kamui Kobayashi won two sprint races in Sepang and Sakhir, while Sébastien Buemi won the feature race in Sentul. Marco Bonanomi and Fairuz Fauzy won a sprint race each.

Entry list
All of the teams used the Dallara GP2/05 chassis with Renault-badged 4.0 litre (244 cu in) naturally-aspirated Mecachrome V8 engines order and with tyres supplied by Bridgestone.

Race calendar and results

Championship standings
Scoring system
Points are awarded to the top 8 classified finishers in the Feature race, and to the top 6 classified finishers in the Sprint race. The pole-sitter in the feature race will also receive two points, and one point is given to the driver who set the fastest lap inside the top ten in both the feature and sprint races. No extra points are awarded to the pole-sitter in the sprint race.

Feature race points

Sprint race points
Points are awarded to the top 6 classified finishers.

Drivers' Championship

Notes:
† — Drivers did not finish the race, but were classified as they completed over 90% of the race distance.

Teams' Championship

Notes:
† — Drivers did not finish the race, but were classified as they completed over 90% of the race distance.

Notes

References

GP2 Asia
GP2 Asia Series seasons
GP2 Asia Series